Alex & Co. is an Italian television series that first aired on Disney Channel Italy on May 11, 2015. It was created by Marina Efron Versiglia and stars Leonardo Cecchi, Eleonora Gaggero, Beatrice Vendramin, Saul Nanni, and Federico Russo, as well as English actress Olivia-Mai Barrett in the special season episodes.

The first season premiered in Italy on May 11, 2015, and ended on May 27, 2015. The second season debuted on September 27, 2015, ending on November 29. On January 30, 2016, Disney Channel confirmed that the series was renewed for a third season, which aired from September 24, 2016, to February 18, 2017. The series ended with a set of special episodes from June 26, 2017. An English-dubbed version of the series aired in the United Kingdom, Ireland, Middle Eastern regions and South Africa.

There was a feature film made for the series, Alex & Co: How to Grow Up Despite Your Parents (Come diventare grandi nonostante i genitori), and a spin-off series, Penny on M.A.R.S., that premiered on May 7, 2018. The series follows Alex Leoni, an Italian teen, and his friends Christian Alessi, Nicole de Ponte, Sam Costa and Emma Ferrari as they are students at the Melsher Institute.

Plot

Episodes

Season 1 
The series tells the story of Alex, a smart, brave and well-intentioned teenager who starts high school at the Melcher Institute. It also follows his childhood friends such as Nicole, a sensitive girl who is secretly in love with Alex; and Christian, an athlete who is popular with girls. They quickly become friends with Sam, a shy student, and an attractive girl named Emma, whom Alex falls in love with. They also make the acquaintance of Linda and her group of fake friends: Samantha, Rebecca, Tom, and Barto. Alex soon realizes that high school will not be the party he imagined. Headmaster Ferrari wants the institution to maintain its lead rank in academics, so he bans extracurricular activities like music and acting. Their literature teacher, Professor Belli, encourages the students to follow their dreams nonetheless.

Linda sends Alex and his friends to a forbidden part of the school where the group discovers a secret place in the basement. They form a band called Sound Aloud, and soon after they publish their first song. When Mr. Smith, a record producer, discovers the group, he offers them an album deal, under the condition that Sam be left out. Headmaster Ferrari does not want his daughter Emma to sing at the festival that the band is performing at, so Nicole takes her place to sing with Alex for a duet that the two had written. Linda spills coffee on Nicole's shirt before the concert, so Nicole changes into a dress that she doesn't want to perform in. She stays in the dressing room for two hours. When she finally comes out of her the dressing room in a red dress, she and Alex sing the song he wrote. Together, they finish the song, and after the performance, Alex realizes he has fallen in love with Nicole. He expresses his feelings to her, even though he is already in a relationship with Emma.

At the end of the year, the Melcher Institute wins the academic race, and the principal organizes a year-end concert to raise money for Sam's scholarship. Shortly before the concert, Emma tells Alex that she saw the way he and Nicole acted and they agree to break up because they both don't know what they feel for each other anymore, allowing Alex and Nicole to be together. Nicole overhears Alex telling Christian that he and Nicole can never be together, leading to her getting angry at Alex.

On the night of the concert, Linda traps Nicole and Alex in passageways under the stage. Alex and Nicole try to get out of the tunnels but stop and start talking. Alex tells Nicole why he didn't want to date her at first, and then they make up and share a kiss. They  get out of the tunnels and perform with the rest of the group. The concert is a success, and Professor Belli is admitted as their literature teacher again. Headmaster Ferrari announces that they will have spaces to practice music and drama for the following year. In the end, Christian realizes he is in love with Emma, while Alex's parents tell Mr. Belli that they plan on moving to the United States without Alex's knowledge.

Season 2 
Summer is over and Alex's parents announce that they plan to move the family to the United States. Alex and his older brother Joe are not happy with the news, and with the help of their friends, they try to stay. Eventually, while Joe finds a way to stay, Alex realizes he must move because their mother is ill, and he decides to accompany her. When their mother faints as they pack, the family panics, only to discover that she is not ill, but actually pregnant. The doctor advises her not to leave the country, thus the move was cancelled. Meanwhile, the Melsher Institute begins a new year and the group cannot wait to spend time together again. Rebecca and Sam realize they love each other and become a couple.

The band decides to participate in The Talent, a show where they get the chance to win a recording contract and a European tour. They decide to change the name of the band to 'Alex & Co'. Meanwhile, Linda and her friends form a band called The Lindas, and her mother buys them a song from Mr. Smith, who is now one of the talent show's panelists. Sam discovers the deception and the group plans to reveal it to the creator of The Talent.

Tension among the members of Alex & Co. cause Alex and Nicole to have an on-and-off relationship; eventually reuniting as a couple. Emma and Christian also date, though a lie told by Linda causes them to break up until Rebecca reveals the truth. Alex & Co. separate for some time, during which Alex is offered a solo recording contract. Instead, he chooses to bring the band back together. As Alex & Co. are about to perform on stage, Joe announces to Alex that their mother has given birth to a baby girl. After meeting his new baby sister, Alex performs "We Are One". The band reveals the deception of The Lindas, and Alex & Co. win The Talent. Nicole feels overwhelmed by the pressure of her being a semi-celebrity, so she decides to leave the band, and end her relationship with Alex.

Season 3

Season 3 Part 1 
With Nicole having left the band, Alex & Co. starts to record their album, but Emma leaves the band when she loses her voice and has to get surgery. She also finds out that her father was fired as headmaster, but he is rehired soon after. Alex and Nicole mend their friendship, but instead of rejoining the band, she gets involved in saving a local theatre, The Blue Factory, which is run by her former babysitter Sara. Linda returns as a calmer and friendlier person, and The Lindas join Alex and Co. A new student named Clio arrives at the Melsher Institute, who is new in the area after having been bullied in her former school and deciding to quit her dream of being a dancer. She has a troubled relationship with Alex, but he sees through her hardened exterior. They grow closer and start dating.

Frustrated with the direction that their new manager Diana is taking the band in, Alex creates a secret masked internet artist persona named 'Nobody', and releases a song called "I Am Nobody" online, which finds worldwide success. Sam's personality starts to change because of the band's fame, but after a reality check from Rebecca, he returns to his normal self and applies for a scholarship to a prestigious school. Alex & Co. quits the record company and disbands, ending Linda's hopes of fame and turning her back to her old sinister self. Nicole develops feelings for Nobody, who encourages her to write her first song. She kisses him, not knowing he is really Alex. The original Alex & Co. is reunited, and they work to save The Blue Factory together. Sam is accepted to the new school but will have to leave earlier than expected. 

At The Blue Factory's fundraiser concert, Rebecca leaves The Lindas after learning that Linda is still trying to destroy Alex & Co. Linda gets her dad to buy the theatre building as a roadblock for the gang. Rebecca sings with Sam, Clio dances on stage for the first time in months, and Alex & Co. performs "Welcome to Your Show", written by Nicole and Emma. After the band says goodbye to Sam, Alex reveals to the world that he is really Nobody.

Season 3 Part 2 
One week after the Nobody reveal, Christian has moved to Australia with his family. Alex works to regain Clio and Nicole's trust after they find out that he was Nobody. Diana also encourages him to continue as a solo artist and manage his own career. After The Blue Factory's fundraiser is a success, the gang opens a record label. The Blue Factory Records, Alex encounters difficulty when the public only seems interested in Nobody. Rebecca and Emma bond over their failed long-distance relationships with Sam and Christian respectively. Ray is revealed to be Nina's son. Rebecca's sister Giada joins The Lindas, ignoring Rebecca's warnings about Linda. Rebecca falls for Matt, a pianist from a wealthy family.

The girls work to make Nina and Mr. Ferrari a couple. Emma's feelings for Ray grow as they work on the song 'So Far Yet So Close' together. Mr. Ferrari forbids their relationship, seeing Ray as a bad influence, which causes a hurt Nina to break up with Mr. Ferrari. Emma stands up to her dad and stays with Ray, while Mr. Ferrari apologizes to Nina. Nina makes amends with Ray for not giving him the benefit of the doubt. Nicole goes to a songwriting school, but realizes that she's still in love with Alex. She leaves a set of lyrics for a song called "The Magic of Love" with Sara. Alex is given the lyrics to add to his music, but Sara doesn't tell him who wrote them. Clio gets into the academy after auditioning with Alex; Matt also gets into the academy, but Rebecca finds out about his family's wealth. After he explains why he hid the truth from her, they tell each other that they love each other.

Clio's ex-boyfriend Ivan joins forces with Linda to help him get Clio back and to help Linda finally destroy Alex. Ivan steals the Nobody persona and tries to paint Alex as the impostor, but Ivan and Linda argue about the plan. Clio amicably breaks up with Alex when she realizes that he belongs with Nicole. With the gang's help and support, Alex is finally ready to take on Ivan. At the final Nobody challenge at the Blue Factory, Emma and Ray perform "So Far Yet So Close". Alex and Ivan perform "I Am Nobody", both dressed as Nobody and matching each other in dancing skills. Alex's voice modulator was sabotaged, so he sings without his mask. On the other hand, Ivan can't sing without his mask, which Linda had told Ivan was his biggest mistake in challenging Alex. This proves that Ivan is the impostor. Having reclaimed Nobody, Alex officially retires the persona, planning to only perform as Alex Leoni from then on. Nicole returns, entering the theatre as Alex is performing "The Magic of Love". After he realizes that she wrote the lyrics about him and their relationship, they kiss and get back together.

Special episodes 
Alex and Nicole got back together. Alex & Co. are invited to the special edition of The Talent World, a show in which the contestants are the winners of the previous seasons of The Talent worldwide. Alex and his friends, however, decide to reject the invitation to focus on the music projects of their record company. Nicole, in fact, has a new big dream: to get her new lyrics sung by Bakìa, the greatest pop star of the moment.

Alex, Nicole, Emma, Ray and Rebecca go to Matt's villa for his birthday. During the party, Nicole discovers that next to Matt's house, Bakìa is shooting a new music video. Nicole tries to get closer to the pop star, but is the victim of a serious accident. Thanks to the help of an unknown girl, Penny, Nicole is safe, but her savior mysteriously disappeared. Alex and his friends are desperate: Nicole is in a coma and it is unknown if or when she will wake up.

Cast

Main

Recurring

Supporting

Music 

Songs are performed by the main cast unless otherwise noted.

We Are One (2016) 

The first album from the series, titled We Are One, was released on January 29, 2016 in Italy. It consists of the songs from the first and second seasons. The first two songs are from the first seasons, while the rest are from the second season. The album features a bonus track, "Wake Up" by The Vamps, who performed the song at The Talent in the final episode of the second season.

Welcome to Your Show (2016) 

The second soundtrack album released on December 9, 2016, contains all songs from the previous album except for the bonus track from The Vamps, plus four new songs from the third season of the series and two new songs from the movie based on the series, Alex & Co: How to Grow Up Despite Your Parents (Come diventare grandi nonostante i genitori).

Broadcast 

The first season of the series, consisting of 13 episodes, premiered in Italy on May 11, 2015, and ended on May 27, 2015. The second season of 18 episodes premiered on September 27, 2015, and ended on November 29, 2015. The third season of the series premiered on September 24, 2016, and went on a hiatus on October 22, 2016, after airing the first half of the season, 10 episodes. The movie Alex & Co: How to Grow Up Despite Your Parents (originally titled Come diventare grandi nonostante i genitori), which is based on this series, was released in Italian cinemas on November 24, 2016. The remaining 10 episodes of the third season aired from January 21, 2017, to February 18, 2017.

Four special episodes aired from June 26, 2017, to June 29, 2017, marking the end of the series.

There is an English-language version of the series being broadcast in Middle Eastern regions, Nordic countries, Hungary and Czech Republic, and South Africa.

In South Africa, Season 1 first aired from March 3, 2016, to May 26, 2016; Season 2 from July 7, 2016, to November 3, 2016; Season 3 Part 1 from April 3, 2017, to April 14, 2017; and Season 3 Part 2 from July 17, 2017, to July 28, 2017.

On June 24, 2017, the series premiered in the United Kingdom and Ireland on Disney Channel. Series 2 premiered on 2 January 2018. The English dub used is the same as that of the Middle East and South Africa.

Reception 

The final episode of the first season reached peaks of 250,000 viewers, of which 150,000 were children aged 4 to 16 years, and 120,000 were girls aged 8 to 16 years.

Other media

Film

On December 2, 2015, Disney Channel Italy announced the release of a movie based on the series, titled Alex & Co: How to Grow Up Despite Your Parents (Come diventare grandi nonostante i genitori), which was released on November 24, 2016, in Italian cinemas. It premiered in the United States at the Los Angeles Italia Film Festival on February 21, 2017. In the United Kingdom, it was shown on March 5, 2018, on Disney Channel.

Spin-offs

Penny on M.A.R.S.

A spin-off series titled Penny on M.A.R.S. was announced on June 29, 2017. It follows the adventures of Penny, the main character in the special episodes of the original show, and her dream to enter the music high school M.A.R.S.. It premiered on Disney Channel Italy on May 7, 2018, and on Disney Channel UK on June 4, 2018.

Radio Alex
On January 30, 2016, Disney Channel Italy announced a spin-off titled  Radio Alex. It aired in Italy on February 8, 2016. It stars Alex as he manages the Melsher Institute radio station where, with the help of his friends, he talks about general topics; posing questions to the audience and transmitting all the successful songs of international artists.

Alex & Co. Fan Event
On April 20, 2016, the cast of the series performed the songs of the series in a live concert in Milan called Alex & Co. Fan Event.

Notes

References

External links 
 

2010s Italian television series
2015 Italian television series debuts
Italian-language Disney Channel original programming
Television series by Disney
Italian children's television series
Italian comedy television series